The FAI Cup 2004 was the 84th staging of The Football Association of Ireland Challenge Cup or Carlsberg FAI Cup. It officially kicked off in late May, when twenty clubs from the junior and intermediate leagues battled it out for the chance to face League of Ireland opposition in the second round. The ten winners of those ties were joined in the second round by the 22 eircom League of Ireland clubs. The competition ran until October, with the final taking place on Sunday, October 24.

First round
Fixtures played weekend May 23

Belgrove         	0-1	Leeds

Carrick United        	3-2	Bluebell United

Cherry Orchard	1-2	Glebe North

Drumcondra A.F.C. 	1-1	Letterkenny Rovers

Fairview Rangers	0-2	Wayside Celtic

Freebooters     	3-3	Portmarnock

Moyle Park College 	1-1	Quay Celtic

Ringmahon Rangers	3-0	CYM Terenure

Rockmount 	2-2	College Corinthians

Tullamore 	1-1 Bangor Celtic

Replays
Bangor Celtic   0-1 Tullamore

College Corinthians  2-3	Rockmount

Letterkenny Rovers	0-2 Drumcondra A.F.C.

Portmarnock          	w/o 	Freebooters

Quay Celtic        	2-1	Moyle Park College

Second round
Matches played on the weekend of Sunday, 25 July 2004.

Third round
Matches played on the week of Monday, 16 August 2004.

Quarter-finals

Replays

Semi-finals

Replay

Final

References

 
FAI Cup seasons
1

lt:Airijos futbolo varžybos 2004 m.